Heinz Wackers (20 September 1925 – 31 December 2012) was a professional ice hockey player. He represented Germany in the 1952 Winter Olympics, where the team finished 8th in the rankings.

References

External links
 

1925 births
2012 deaths
German ice hockey goaltenders
Ice hockey players at the 1952 Winter Olympics
Olympic ice hockey players of Germany
Sportspeople from Krefeld